Krien is a municipality in the Vorpommern-Greifswald district, in Mecklenburg-Vorpommern, Germany.

Notable people
Marie Schnür (1869 – after 1918), painter

References

Vorpommern-Greifswald